Michael M. J. Fischer is Andrew W. Mellon Professor in the Humanities and Professor of Anthropology and Science and Technology Studies at the Massachusetts Institute of Technology, and Lecturer in the Department of Global Health and Social Medicine, Harvard Medical School.

Works

Books 
 
 
  Details.
 
  Details.
  Details.

Book chapters

Journal articles

External links
List of books from Fetchbook
Faculty Bio from MIT Anthropology

Johns Hopkins University alumni
University of Chicago alumni
Harvard Medical School faculty
Rice University faculty
University of Chicago faculty
Living people
Year of birth missing (living people)
Iranologists
American Iranologists
Massachusetts Institute of Technology faculty